Die Glückspuppe is a short 1911 Austrian film directed by Jakob and Luise Fleck.

Cast
Mizzi Bittner ...  Blumenverkäuferin (flower-seller) Mizzi 
 Werzel ...  Elly, ihr Kind (Her child)
Max Bing ...  Robert Sassen 
Ernst Lunzer

External links
 

1911 films
1911 short films
Austrian black-and-white films
Austrian silent short films
Austro-Hungarian films